Khin Maung Latt (17 November 1953 - 7 March 2021) was a Burmese politician and an Amyotha Hluttaw MP for Rakhine State  No. 2 Constituency. He was a member of Rakhine National Party.

Early life and education
He was  born on 17 November 1953 in Rakhine State, Burma (Myanmar). His previous jobs were as a journalist and MP in the Amyotha Hluttaw.

Political career
In the 2010 Myanmar general election, he was elected as an Amyotha Hluttaw MP and elected representative from Rakhine State № 6 parliamentary constituency. In the general election of 2015, he was elected as an MP in the Amyotha Hluttaw and elected representative from Rakhine State № 3 parliamentary constituency.

Death
Latt died 7 March 2021 after having been forcibly removed from his home by the military.

References

1953 births
Living people
People from Rakhine State
Arakanese politicians
Arakan Front Party politicians
Members of the House of Nationalities